Amla is a municipality located in Betul district in the Indian state of Madhya Pradesh. It is the administrative center and only municipality of the Amla Subdivision.

History 
Historically, Amla belonged to the Central Provinces of British India. The long Mohammedan dominion of the Central Provinces left its mark in the names of several places in the district, many of which were named after plants or trees. Amla was named after the Mango(Ām) fruit.

A popular theory claims that the name Amla is short for Ammunition Land. However, this is only a backronym that was invented in recent times.

Before 1989, Amla railway station was used as a base kitchen for catering. In 1989, the base kitchen was shifted to Itarsi.

Geography
Bodkhi and Amla Town markets are situated in the sub-district. Pachama is the biggest waterfall, located 20 kilometres from the railway station.

Government 
The city is divided into 18 wards. Amla is the sub-district headquarters. The district headquarters is Betul. Bhopal is the state headquarters for the city.

Education 
The major educational institutions are:

 GOVT BR AMBEDKAR COLLEGE HASALPUR, AMLA 
 NANDKISHORE PATEL MAHAVIDYALAYA AMLA 
 KENDRIYA VIDYALAYA AMLA 
 BASIC SCHOOL (GOVT.),AMLA
 PARADISE HIGHER SECONDARY SCHOOL AMLA 
 LIFE CAREER SCHOOL (CBSE SCHOOL) 
 GURU NANAK HIGHER SECONDARY SCHOOL 
 THAKUR INDAL SINGH GIRLS COLLEGE 
 INDIAN COMPUTER SCIENCE & TECHNOLOGY INSTITUTE AFFILIATED BY MAHARSHI MAHESH YOGI VAIDIK VISHWAVIDHYALAYA, JABALPUR 
 JAWAHARLAL NEHRU COLLEGE, AMLA
 ST.THOMAS MISSION HIGH SCHOOL, MANGAL BHAVAN, AMLA
 MOTHERLAND PUBLIC SCHOOL, RATEDA ROAD, AMLA 
 NEW IDEAL SCHOOL, GOVIND COLONY AMLA 
PANDIT SHANKAR LAL SHARMA SCHOOL, AMLA

Worship Locations 
A Hanuman Mandir is situated near Govind Colony. A temple of Renuka Mata is located in Chhawal.And near it, the remains of ancient Buddhist idols of Bodhisatva Avalokiteshvara and vajarpani are seen in Kajali Kanojia and a very beautiful Buddhist temple is also located in Bhimnagar, in which Buddhist followers from all over the country and abroad keep visiting.

A beautiful Shani Mandir located in Gorakshnath Colony in Amla adorned with Graceful Murtis of Lord Shani Dev, Lord Hanuman, Lord Shiva's Family and Navgraha Murtis. Mandir was recently inaugurated on 19 December 2021.

Demographics 
As of a 2011 Indian census, Amla had a population of 30,215, including 15,562 males and 14,653 females. Children aged 0–6 number 3,141, 10.40% of the total. The female sex ratio is 942 against the state average of 931. The child sex ratio in Amla is around 961 compared to the Madhya Pradesh state average of 918.

The literacy rate is 89.04%, higher than the state average of 69.32%. The male literacy is around 94.36%, while the female literacy rate is around 83.38%.

The population density is 4,728 persons per km2.

Transport 
Amla junction is the main junction of the Betul district.

The nearest railway station is within the city. Amla accommodates a rail junction, served by broad gauge lines, which connects the sub-district to Itarsi (in the north), Nagpur (in the southeast), and Chhindwara (in the east).

References 

Nagpur-Itarsi rail line
Amla-Chhindwara rail line
Cities and towns in Betul district